Oliva reticulata, common name the blood olive, is a species of sea snail, a marine gastropod mollusk in the family Olividae, the olives.

Description
The length of the shell varies between 32 mm and 50 mm.

Distribution
This species occurs in the Indian Ocean off Madagascar and in the Pacific Ocean off New Caledonia.

References

 Duclos, P. L. (1835-1840). Histoire naturelle générale et particulière de tous les genres de coquilles univalves marines a l'état vivant et fossile publiée par monographie. Genre Olive. Paris: Institut de France. 33 plates: pls 1-12

External links
 Duclos, P. L. (1835-1840). Histoire naturelle générale et particulière de tous les genres de coquilles univalves marines a l'état vivant et fossile publiée par monographie. Genre Olive. Paris: Institut de France. 33 plates: pls 1-12
 

reticulata
Gastropods described in 1798
Molluscs of Madagascar
Molluscs of the Pacific Ocean